José Adalberto Cuero García (born March 30, 1990), known as José Cuero, is a football player, who plays for Millonarios in the Categoría Primera A, as a defender or midfield. Cuero is a product of the Millonarios youth system and played with the Millonarios first team since March, 2010.

Statistics (Official games/Colombian Ligue and Colombian Cup)
(As of November 14, 2010)

Notes

References

External links

 

1990 births
Living people
Colombian footballers
Millonarios F.C. players
Expatriate footballers in Peru
Association football midfielders
Footballers from Bogotá